Bruce George is the co-founder of the award-winning "Russell Simmons Presents, Def Poetry Jam (HBO)," and the Founder of a growing "Genius Is Common" Movement. He is also an executive producer, writer, poet, entrepreneur, author, speaker and social activist. He was born and raised in New York City. He has written poetry/prose & articles for over 36 years.

Genius Is Common
The slogan used Genius is Common suggests that all beings have an extraordinary or exceptional creative power in them. The idea implying that for example a woman that comes from a city, who knows how to micro braid hair, as Picasso painted; that skill is her genius. The movement has been gaining some attention due to its optimistic ideals, its key concept being that every being has their own unique way of expressing their passion, in their profession, their art or their talents.

Poetic Stance
"It’s imperative that these spoken word artists be catapulted to the mainstream and be recognized. Finally the marriage between hip-hop and spoken word can begin the arduous task of reconciliation."
—Bruce George

Awards
 “Peabody Award” for “Russell Simmons Presents, Def Poetry (HBO)” 
 “Miky Award” for “Russell Simmons Presents, Def Poetry Jam (HBO)”

Education
George graduated from Niagara University with a B.A. degree in psychology.

Bibliography
Bruce George is the Founder/Managing Editor of:
 “The Bandana Republic, an Anthology of Poetry & Prose by Gang Members & Their Affiliates.” (2008)

References

External links
Genius Is Common
Bruce George

Living people
Writers from New York City
American talent agents
Niagara University alumni
Year of birth missing (living people)